Leslie Vernon may refer to:
 Leslie "Les" Vernon, Australian sportsman
 Leslie Vernon, the main character of the film Behind the Mask: The Rise of Leslie Vernon
 Les Vernon (footballer) (1905-1979), English footballer for Bury, Preston North End and Swansea Town